Dendrobium schneiderae, commonly known as the Eungella moon orchid or small moon orchid, is an epiphytic orchid in the family Orchidaceae and is endemic to eastern Australia. It has crowded pseudobulbs with two leaves on the tip of each and arching flowering stems with up to thirty five waxy, yellowish, cup-shaped flowers. It grows in open forest and rainforest.

Description 
Dendrobium schneiderae is an epiphytic herb which forms small, dense clumps. The side lobes are red and relatively long compared to the short middle lobe, which has a fleshy plate in its centre. Flowering occurs from January to April.

Taxonomy and naming
Dendrobium schneiderae was first formally described in 1886 by Frederick Manson Bailey and the description was published in Occasional Papers on the Queensland Flora. The specific epithet (schneiderae) honours the collector of the type specimen, "Mrs H. Schneider, a lady who has been most successful in collecting and cultivating Queensland ferns and orchids".

There are two varieties of this orchid:
 Dendrobium schneiderae var. major, Rupp – the Eungella moon orchid, which has larger flowers and only occurs near Eungella in Queensland, where it grows on ironbark in open forest and palm trees in rainforest;
 Dendrobium schneiderae var. schneiderae – the small moon orchid which has smaller flowers and is found between Gympie in Queensland and the Clarence River in New South Wales where it grows in well-lit places in rainforest.

References

schneiderae
Orchids of New South Wales
Orchids of Queensland
Plants described in 1886